Loupe  is a locational surname of French origin, which originally meant a person from Loupes or La Loupe in France. The name may refer to:

Andrew Loupe (born 1988), American golfer

See also
Loup (surname)
Loupe, a small magnification device

References

French-language surnames